The 2017–18 Belmont Bruins women's basketball team represents Belmont University during the 2017–18 NCAA Division I women's basketball season. The Bruins, led by first year head coach Bart Brooks, play their home games at the Curb Event Center as members of the Ohio Valley Conference (OVC). They finished the season 31–4, 18–0 in OVC play win the OVC regular season. They won the OVC women's tournament by defeating UT Martin and earns an automatic trip to the NCAA women's tournament where they lost to Duke in the first round. With 31 wins, they finish with most wins in school history.

Roster

Schedule and results

|-
!colspan=9 style=| Non–conference regular season

|-
!colspan=9 style=| Ohio Valley Conference regular season

|-
!colspan=9 style=| Ohio Valley Conference tournament

|-
!colspan=9 style=| NCAA Women's Tournament

Rankings
2017–18 NCAA Division I women's basketball rankings

See also
2017–18 Belmont Bruins men's basketball team

References

Belmont Bruins women's basketball seasons
Belmont Bruins
Belmont
Belmont Bruins women's basketball
Belmont Bruins women's basketball